"Wasted Time" is a song co-written and recorded by New Zealand-born Australian country music artist Keith Urban. It was released on 4 April 2016 as the third single from his 2016 album Ripcord. The song was written by Urban, Greg Wells and James Abrahart.

Promotion
Ahead of the release of the song, as his final performance on American Idol, the show on which Urban has been a judge since 2012, he sang "Wasted Time", playing the "ganjocaster", a combination between a banjo and electric guitar built by his former bandmate Brian Nutter.

Urban also performed the song at the 51st Academy of Country Music Awards playing the banjo and earned a standing ovation from the crowd.

Chart performance
"Wasted Time" reached its peak at number four on the US Hot Country Songs chart and number 51 on the US Billboard Hot 100. The song also topped the US Country Airplay chart in its thirteenth week, making this song Urban's twentieth number one on this chart and stayed atop the chart for a second consecutive week.
As of August 2016, it has sold 269,000 copies in the US On February 24, 2017, the single was certified gold by the Recording Industry Association of America (RIAA) for combined sales and streaming data of over 500,000 units in the United States.

Music video
The music video was directed by John Urbano and premiered in April 2016.

Charts

Weekly charts

Year-end charts

Certifications and sales

References

2016 songs
2016 singles
Keith Urban songs
Capitol Records Nashville singles
Songs written by Keith Urban
Songs written by Greg Wells
Songs written by James Abrahart
Song recordings produced by Greg Wells